Dysfunctional refers to abnormality in behaviour.

Dysfunctional may also refer to:

 Dysfunctional family
 Dysfunctional (Dokken album)
 Dysfunctional (Bachelor Girl album)
 Dysfunctional (Tech N9ne song)

See also
 
 Functional (disambiguation)
 Dysfunction (disambiguation)